Thissen is a surname. Notable people with the surname include:

David Thissen (born c. 1950), American professor of psychology
Frans Thissen (born 1909), Belgian rower
Jean Thissen (born 1946), Belgian footballer
Paul Thissen (born 1966), American politician
Tof Thissen (born 1957), Dutch politician
Werner Thissen (born 1938), German Roman Catholic archbishop

See also
Thiessen (disambiguation)
Thijssen
Thyssen (disambiguation)

Surnames from given names